During the 2004–05 English football season, West Bromwich Albion competed in the FA Premier League.

Season summary
West Bromwich Albion managed to retain their Premiership status despite being in last place on Christmas Day. This was the first time in the history of the Premiership this had happened. Sunderland and Leicester City have since equalled this feat (Sunderland in 2013–14, Leicester in 2014–15), although they secured survival before the final day.

Final day

Going into the final round of matches, no team was assured of relegation. In each of the last three weekends of the season, the team that was bottom of the table at the start of the weekend finished it outside the drop zone. The final round of the season on 15 May started with West Bromwich on the bottom, Southampton and Crystal Palace one point clear and Norwich City in the last safe spot and two points from the bottom. For the first time since the advent of the current Premier League in 1992–1993, no club was assured of relegation going into the final day. Even worse, only one will survive. The final matchday was publicised by Sky Sports as "Survival Sunday", with accompanying promotional material advertising the last matchday like a title fight or epic movie blockbuster.

West Brom, who had been bottom of the table and eight points from safety at Christmas, did their part by defeating Portsmouth at home 2–0. Norwich, the only side to have their fate completely in their own hands, lost 6–0 at Fulham and went down. Southampton lost 2–1 at home to Manchester United. Palace, away to Charlton Athletic, were leading 2–1 after 71 minutes, but with eight minutes to go Jonathan Fortune equalised for the Addicks to relegate the Eagles. Thus, West Brom stayed up, and changed history, becoming the first club in Premiership history to avoid relegation after being bottom of the table at Christmas.

At the end of 90 minutes in all 4 matches, Sky cameras focused on the Hawthorns, as confirmation of other results began to filter through. Once the realisation dawned on the players and fans that survival had been achieved, a mass pitch invasion was sparked, with huge celebrations. The Portsmouth fans in the away end of the ground joined in the celebrations and party atmosphere, as, through losing 2–0 to West Brom, they had "helped" relegate arch-rivals Southampton. The defeat itself mattered little to Portsmouth, as they would be unable to improve on their 16th position due to 15th-placed Blackburn Rovers' greater goal difference.

Final league table

Players

First-team squad
Squad at end of season

Left club during season

Statistics

Appearances and goals
As of end of season

|-
! colspan=14 style=background:#dcdcdc; text-align:center| Goalkeepers

|-
! colspan=14 style=background:#dcdcdc; text-align:center| Defenders

|-
! colspan=14 style=background:#dcdcdc; text-align:center| Midfielders

|-
! colspan=14 style=background:#dcdcdc; text-align:center| Forwards

|-
! colspan=14 style=background:#dcdcdc; text-align:center| Players transferred or loaned out during the season

|-

Starting 11
Considering starts in all competitions

Transfers

In
  Riccardo Scimeca –  Leicester City, 18 May, undisclosed
  Martin Albrechtsen –  København, 3 June, £2,700,000
  Darren Purse –  Birmingham City, 18 June, £750,000
  Tomasz Kuszczak –  Hertha BSC, 14 July, free
  Jonathan Greening –  Middlesbrough, 29 July, £1,250,000
  Zoltán Gera –  Ferencváros, 30 July, £1,500,000
  Nwankwo Kanu –  Arsenal, 30 July, free
  Robert Earnshaw – Cardiff City, 30 August, £3,000,000 (rising to £3,620,000 depending on contractual incentives)
  Cosmin Contra –  Atlético Madrid, 31 August, season-long loan
  Junichi Inamoto –  Gamba Osaka, 31 August, £200,000
  Kevin Campbell –  Everton, 10 January, free
  Kieran Richardson –  Manchester United, 29 January, season-long loan
  Richard Chaplow –  Burnley, 31 January, £1,500,000

Out
  Phil Gilchrist – released, 10 May (later joined  Rotherham United)
  Daniel Crane – released, 10 May (later joined  Burton Albion)
  Joost Volmer – released, 10 May (later joined  Den Bosch)
  Delroy Facey – released, 10 May (later joined  Hull City on 25 June)
  Tamika Mkandawire – released, 10 May (later joined  Hereford United on 9 July)
  Mark Kinsella – released, 10 May (later joined  Walsall on 27 July)
  Lee Hughes – contract terminated, 9 August
  Sean Gregan –  Leeds United, £500,000 (rising to £750,000 dependent on appearances), 16 September
  James Chambers –  Watford, £250,000, 25 September
  Scott Dobie –  Millwall, £750,000, 8 November
  Larus Sigurdsson – retired, 2 December
  Simon Brown –  Mansfield Town, 6 December, £50,000
  Lloyd Dyer –  Coventry City, three-month loan, 22 March
  Lee Marshall – retired, 22 April
  Bernt Haas – released, 21 January (later joined  Bastia)
  Rob Hulse –  Leeds United, 9 February, season-long loan
  Sékou Berthé – released, 9 February
  Simon Miotto – released, 9 February
  Adam Chambers – released, 9 February (later joined  Kidderminster Harriers)
  James O'Connor –  Burnley, £175,000, 24 March
  Phillip Midworth – released (later joined  Burton Albion on 11 February)

Transfers in:  £10,800,000
Transfers out:  £1,675,000
Total spending:  £9,125,000

Results

West Bromwich Albion's result comes first

Premier League

Results per matchday

FA Cup

Football League Cup

Notes

References

West Bromwich Albion F.C. seasons
West Brom